Alexander Evans  (October 17, 1897 – death date unknown) was an American baseball pitcher in the Negro leagues. He played with the Bacharach Giants, Indianapolis ABCs and Memphis Red Sox in 1924.

Career
Evans attended Henderson High School in Henderson, North Carolina.
He and Bill Nuttall joined the Bacharach Giants in June 1924 after Arnett Mitchell was given his release.

References

External links
 and Seamheads

Bacharach Giants players
Indianapolis ABCs players
Memphis Red Sox players
1897 births
Year of death unknown
Baseball players from South Carolina
Baseball pitchers
People from Charleston, South Carolina